Neemali is a village as well as a gram panchayat  in Dausa District in the State of Rajasthan, India. Neemali was founded by Neema Singh Gurjar. He belonged to Awana clan of Gurjar community. Neemali is located at a distance of 15 km from the district headquarter of Dausa. According to information from the 2011 census the location code or village code of Neemali is 078457. The postal code of Neemali is 303325.

The total geographical area of village is 408.5 hectares. Neemali has a total population of 2,175 peoples. There are about 310 houses in Neemali.100% of the population of Neemali follows Hinduism.An ancient lord Shiva temple is situated in the middle of the village. Apart from this a temple of lord Krishna  is also present in the village.Dausa is the nearest town to Neemali.

Villages in Dausa district